HD 128429 is a binary star system located at a distance of 88 light years from the Sun in the southern zodiac constellation of Libra. It has a yellow-white hue and is just barely visible to the naked eye with an apparent visual magnitude of 6.20. It is a well-known high velocity star system with a net heliocentric velocity of 158.8 km/s.

This star was found to be a binary system based on variations in radial velocity data collected from the Hipparcos satellite. The eccentricity of the orbit is unknown, but has been assumed to be near zero.

The visible member of this system, designated component Aa, has a stellar classification of F6V. Superficially, it resembles 2–3 billion year old F-type main-sequence star that is generating energy through core hydrogen fusion. However, the star displays anomalies that are a challenge to explain through the normal star formation process. The first is the high velocity orbit of the star through the Milky Way, which would be very difficult for a young population I star to accomplish. The second is an abnormally low iron-to-magnesium [Fe/Mg] abundance ratio. This strongly suggests it is an ancient population II star that was formed during the early starburst phase of the galaxy about 12 billion years ago – a period when high levels of magnesium was released during supernovae explosions of massive stars. Both anomalies can be explained by a mass transfer that converted a much older star into a blue straggler.

Evidence suggests that the companion, Ab, is a white dwarf star that evolved from an F- or G-type main-sequence star with a similar mass to the current primary. As component Ab became a red giant, it overflowed its Roche lobe and mass transfer took place. The white dwarf now has less than half the mass of the Sun, having transferred a substantial fraction of its mass to the current primary. The interaction would have circularized the orbit of the pair.

The current primary has 1.32 times the mass of the Sun and 1.39 times the Sun's radius. It has a low metallicity and is completely lacking in lithium. The star is spinning with a projected rotational velocity of 16.2 km/s. It is radiating 2.75 times the luminosity of the Sun from its photosphere at an effective temperature of 6,341 K. The system is a source for X-ray emission.

References

F-type main-sequence stars
Blue stragglers
White dwarfs
Binary stars

Libra (constellation)
Durchmusterung objects
111395
62523